Macarthur Job (10 April 1926 in Taree, New South Wales – 6 August 2014 in Melbourne) was an Australian aviation writer and air safety consultant. He published nine books on aviation safety. He was formerly a Flying Doctor pilot and held a pilot licence until his death.

Job was a Senior Inspector with the Air Safety Investigation Branch of the Australian Department of Civil Aviation, and for 14 years was editor of the Department’s Aviation Safety Digest. The magazine won the US Flight Safety Foundation's Publication of the Year award. In 1980 he was appointed editor of the Australian aviation industry journal Aircraft, published by The Herald and Weekly Times Limited. A year later, as a member of the Guild of Air Pilots and Air Navigators, he was granted the Freedom of the City of London.

In 1984, he became a working Director of the Missionary Aviation Fellowship (MAF) - a professional, non-profit organisation which operates more than 40 aircraft in community development  work in Papua New Guinea and outback Australia. In 1989 he began working as an independent aviation writer, specialising in air safety.

At the Australian International Airshow in 1997, Job was presented with the Aviation Safety Foundation’s award for ‘Aviation Safety Excellence’ and the AOPA’s Adams Trophy. In the Queen's Birthday Honours for 2003, he was awarded the Medal of the Order of Australia (OAM) for ‘services to the promotion and advancement of aviation safety’.

He contributed to Australian Aviation, Aero Australia, and the Civil Aviation Safety Authority’s Flight Safety Australia magazines. He has also written for the British Aeroplane, the U.S Flying and Airways magazines, for Time magazine, The Sydney Morning Herald, The Age and The Sun-Herald newspapers. He was a consultant for the TV series Black Box and flew as a staff pilot with the Scout Air Activity Centre in Victoria.

Books
 
 
 
 
 
 
 
 

(Air Disaster, Volumes 1-3 illustrated by Matthew Tesch. Air Disaster Volume 4 illustrated by Juanita Franzi. Cover paintings for Disaster in the Dandenongs and Into Oblivion by Norman Clifford.)

References

External links

Airways Museum biography
Bibliography at the National Library of Australia
 MacarthurJob.com  [Personal Website]

Aviation writers
Australian aviators
Recipients of the Medal of the Order of Australia
1926 births
2014 deaths
Royal Flying Doctor Service of Australia people
Writers from New South Wales
20th-century Australian male writers
21st-century Australian male writers